, meaning roughly "lower level", is one of the three heights commonly referred to in Japanese martial arts. It refers specifically to the lower part of the body, from the belt on the karategi and below.

See also
Chūdan
Jōdan

Directional terms in Japanese martial arts